The 1880 United States presidential election in Rhode Island took place on November 2, 1880, as part of the 1880 United States presidential election. Voters chose four representatives, or electors to the Electoral College, who voted for president and vice president.

Rhode Island voted for the Republican nominee, James A. Garfield, over the Democratic nominee, Winfield Scott Hancock. Garfield won the state by a margin of 25.37%.

With 62.24% of the popular vote, Rhode Island would be Garfield's fourth strongest victory in terms of percentage in the popular vote after Vermont, Nebraska and Minnesota.

Results

See also
 United States presidential elections in Rhode Island

References

Rhode Island
1880
1880 Rhode Island elections